Astrup is a village in Ringkøbing-Skjern Municipality, Denmark.

References

Villages in Denmark
Populated places in Central Denmark Region
Ringkøbing-Skjern Municipality